The Little Blackwater River is a tributary of the Blackwater River located in Dorchester County, Maryland.

It is located between Maple Dam Road to the east and Egypt Road to the west.

References 

Rivers of Dorchester County, Maryland
Rivers of Maryland
Tributaries of the Chesapeake Bay